Veľké Chyndice is a village and municipality in the Nitra District of western central Slovakia, in the Nitra Region.

History
The village and municipality is a new settlement established in 1234.

Geography
The village lies at an altitude of 172 metres and covers an area of 5.0496 km². It has a population of about 345 people.

Ethnicity
The population is about 75% Slovak and 25% Magyar.

References

External links
https://web.archive.org/web/20070513023228/http://www.statistics.sk/mosmis/eng/run.html

Villages and municipalities in Nitra District